Raleigh Charter High School is a free, independent public school chartered by the North Carolina State Board of Education. It was founded in 1998 by parents of eighth graders at Magellan Charter School.

From its inception through the 2010–2011 school year, Raleigh Charter occupied the historic Pilot Mill behind Peace College in downtown Raleigh. Over the summer of 2011, the school moved to the former Methodist Building on Glenwood Avenue. This location offers proximity to downtown Raleigh; the move, however, was motivated not by dissatisfaction with Pilot Mill, but by financial issues: the school rented its first space, but owns the current one.

Raleigh Charter High School is ranked 2nd within North Carolina. Students have the opportunity to take Advanced Placement course work and exams. The AP participation rate at Raleigh Charter High School is 95 percent. The student body makeup is 48 percent male and 52 percent female, and the total minority enrollment is 37 percent.

As of the 2015–2016 school year, the school's 4-year graduation rate was 95%.

Honors and awards
On December 5, 2008, U.S. News & World Report ranked Raleigh Charter the 20th best high school in the country. In 2005 Raleigh Charter High School was named the ninth best public high school in the nation by Newsweek magazine based on the number of students taking Advanced Placement tests.  It was rated number 53 and 18 in 2006 and 2007, respectively.  In 2003, 99 percent of tenth grade students at Raleigh Charter High School met or exceeded the requirements of the North Carolina End-of-Course Tests. For five years Raleigh Charter's students have been well ahead the state's high schools in EOC scores. In addition, almost everyone in the senior class of 2004 was accepted into college.

In the College Board's AP Report for 2005, Raleigh Charter High School had the highest percentage of students scoring a 3 or higher on the Environmental Science AP Test for medium-sized schools in the world.

The school also posted the highest average SAT score in the Raleigh Durham area: of 1861 with 100% of students taking the test.

Athletics 
Raleigh Charter offers a variety of varsity sports, competing in the 2A division of sports sanctioned by the NCHSAA:
 Cross Country
 Varsity Men's and Women's Golf
 Varsity Men's and Women's Basketball
 Varsity Men's and Women's Soccer
 Junior Varsity Men's Soccer
 Men's and Women's Swimming
 Men's and Women's Tennis
 Track and Field
 Volleyball
Rowing and Ultimate, among others, are offered as club sports.

State championships 
 Tennis
 2015 Men's 
 2016 Men's and Women's
 2017 Men's and Women's
 2018 Men's and Women's
 2021 Men's (co-champion)
 Soccer
 2007 Women's 
 2015 Women's 
 Swimming 
 2011 Women's
 2012 Women's
 2013 Women's 
 2014 Women's
 2015 Women's
 2018 Men's and Women's

Academic competitions

Science Olympiad 
The Raleigh Charter Science Olympiad team first appeared at the national tournament in 2004, after winning the North Carolina state championship. They appeared at the national tournament in ten of the following fourteen years, winning the state championship four times and being the state runner-up six times in that period.

Notable alumni
 James Kotecki (c/o 2004) – political video blogger
 Kate Rhudy (c/o 2013) — singer and musician
 Jacob Tobia (c/o 2010) – author, television producer and host, LGBTQ rights activist

References

External links
Raleigh Charter High School website
US Department of Education: The Education Innovator
The North Carolina Report Card
Raleigh Charter Quiz Bowl Team

Public high schools in North Carolina
Educational institutions established in 1998
Schools in Raleigh, North Carolina
Charter schools in North Carolina
Charter high schools in the United States